Thysanopyge is an extinct genus from a well-known class of fossil marine arthropods, the trilobites. It lived in what is now South America during the early part of the Arenig stage of the Ordovician Period, a faunal stage which lasted from approximately 478 to 471 million years ago.

Distribution 
Fossils of Thysanopyge have been found in:
Argentina
 Acoite Formation
 Las Aguaditas Formation
 Santa Rosita Formation

Bolivia
 Obispo Formation
 San Lorenzo Formation

References

Further reading 
 H. J. Harrington and A. F. Leanza. 1957. Ordovician trilobites of Argentina. Department of Geology, University of Kansas Special Publication. Lawrence: University of Kansas Press 1:1-276
 A. Pribyl and J. Vanek. 1980. Ordovician trilobites of Bolivia. Rozpravy Ceskoslovenske Akademie Ved. Rada Matematickych a Prirodnich Ved. Academia Praha, Prague, Czechoslovakia 90(2):1-90
 R. Suárez Soruco. 1976. El sistema ordovícico en Bolivia. Revista Tecnica YPF Bolivia 5(2):111-123

Asaphida genera
Asaphidae
Ordovician trilobites of South America
Fossils of Argentina
Fossils of Bolivia
Fossil taxa described in 1898